Isolepis prolifera is a species of flowering plant in the family Cyperaceae that grows in temperate regions of the Southern Hemisphere.

Description

This proliferation into branches gives the species its scientific name . Each spikelet consists of up to 30 flowers, and the fruit is a nutlet with fine reticulations on its surface.

Isolepis prolifera varies considerably in size, and smaller specimens may resemble the Australasian species Isolepis inundata, although I. inundata normally has some true leaves, and is not always proliferating.

Distribution
Isolepis prolifera is found in a number of countries around the world, although it is not clear where it is native, and where it is an introduced species. The International Union for Conservation of Nature considers it to be native only to South Africa, where it grows in the Eastern Cape, KwaZulu-Natal and Western Cape provinces. It is also widespread in New Zealand, occurring on the South Island, North Island, and on the Chatham Islands, and may be native there. In Australia, I. prolifera occurs in New South Wales, Victoria and Tasmania, as well as in the Mediterranean-climate region of Western Australia. It is also potentially native to Tristan da Cunha and Saint Helena, and has been introduced to France and California.

Ecology
Isolepis prolifera is a perennial plant that grows as a helophyte (marsh plant). It thrives in both eutrophic and oligotrophic wetlands, and can be a weed of drainages on farmland.

Naming
Isolepis prolifera was first described by Christen Friis Rottbøll, a pupil of Carl Linnaeus, in his 1772 work , as "Scirpus prolifer". It was transferred to the genus Isolepis in 1810 by Robert Brown, although it is different from other Isolepis species, and may be better placed in a different genus, such as Scirpoides.

Isolepis prolifera has different common names in different parts of its range. In New Zealand, it either has no common name or is known as "three-square".

References

prolifera
Flora of South Africa
Flora of Australia
Flora of New Zealand
Flora of Tristan da Cunha
Flora of Saint Helena
Plants described in 1772